Adriana Delpiano Puelma (born February 27, 1947) is a Chilean politician. From 27 June 2015 to 11 March 2018 she was the Minister of Education of Chile in the cabinet of Michelle Bachelet. Formerly, she was Intendant of the Santiago Metropolitan Region. She received a degree in Social Work from the Pontifical Catholic University of Chile, and earned her Masters of Education Science from the Center for Advanced Studies in Mexico.

Delpiano served as Researcher and Director of the Interdisciplinary Program of Research in Education and as professor at the Universidad Católica de Chile.

An activist for the Partido por la Democracia, in 1994 Delpiano was named Minister of National Resources. She left the ministry in 1999 in order to work as the assistant executive director for the presidential campaign of Ricardo Lagos. Delpiano, a personal friend of President Ricardo Lagos, was named Director-Minister of the National Women's Service (SERNAM), making its primary work on the issues of divorce and domestic violence. She left the ministry in 2003, and later served as Undersecretary of Regional Development. Delpiano was called on to temporarily fill the position of Minister of the Interior from May 9 – May 24, when Francisco Vidal filled the post. In 2006, Delpiano was named by President Michelle Bachelet the Presidency Socio-Cultural Area Director. With this new post, she presided over the foundations and social organizations that depend on the president's cabinet.

In January 2007, Delpiano assumed the role of Intendant (governor) of the Santiago Metropolitan Region, replacing Víctor Barrueto. In this position, she was in charge of the Transantiago transportation project.

References 

|-

|-

|-

1947 births
Living people
People from Santiago
Chilean people of Italian descent
Intendants of Santiago Metropolitan Region
Pontifical Catholic University of Chile alumni
Popular Unitary Action Movement politicians
Party for Democracy (Chile) politicians
Women government ministers of Chile
Chilean Ministers of Education
Government ministers of Chile